Hitman characters may refer to:

 Characters of the DC Comics Hitman franchise
 Characters of the Hitman video game franchise